Cleptometopus scutellatus is a species of beetle in the family Cerambycidae. It was described by Hüdepohl in 1996.

References

scutellatus
Beetles described in 1996